Joseph J. Daniels (1826–1916), most commonly known as J. J. Daniels, was an American bridge builder active in Indiana.  A number of his works are listed on the U.S. National Register of Historic Places.

He was born in 1826 in Marietta, Ohio and learned about bridges from his father, also a bridge builder.  His last bridge was the Neet Bridge, built in 1904.  He died in Rockville, Indiana at age 90.

Works (attribution) include:
Big Rocky Fork Bridge, SE of Mansfield on Greencastle Rd., Mansfield, Indiana (Daniels, J. J.), NRHP-listed
Billie Creek Bridge, E of Rockville off US 36, Billie Creek Village, Rockville, Indiana (Daniels, J. J.), NRHP-listed
Bridgeton Bridge, N of Bridgeton, Bridgeton, Indiana (Daniels, J. J.), NRHP-listed
Eugene Covered Bridge, Former Co. Rd. 00 over Big Vermillion R., Eugene, Indiana (Daniels, Joseph J.), NRHP-listed
Jackson Bridge, N of Rockville, Rockville, Indiana (Daniels, J. J.), NRHP-listed
Mansfield Covered Bridge, Off IN 59, Mansfield, Indiana (Daniels, J. J.), NRHP-listed
Mecca Bridge, Off US 41, Mecca, Indiana (Daniels, J. J.), NRHP-listed
Medora Covered Bridge, off IN 235,  SE of Medora over the east fork of the White River, Medora, Indiana (Daniels, Joseph J.), NRHP-listed
Melcher Bridge, E of Montezuma, Montezuma, Indiana (Daniels, J. J.), NRHP-listed
Neet Bridge, N of Bridgeton, Bridgeton, Indiana (Daniels, J. J.), NRHP-listed
Newport Covered Bridge, Co. Rd. 50N over Little Vermillion R., Newport, Indiana (Daniels, Joseph J.), NRHP-listed
Possum Bottom Covered Bridge, US 36, N side,  E of the jct. with East Rd., Dana, Indiana (Daniels, Joseph J.), NRHP-listed
West Union Bridge, N of Montezuma, Indiana (Daniels, J. J.), NRHP-listed
Williams Bridge, SW of Williams on CR 11, Williams, Indiana (Daniels, J. J.), NRHP-listed

References

1826 births
1916 deaths
People from Marietta, Ohio
American civil engineers
People from Rockville, Indiana
 
Engineers from Ohio